The Armenian Press of Baku has been in service for more than 100 years.

This press published its first Armenian periodical of Baku Haykakan Ashkharh (The Armenian World) in 1874. It was a literary and pedagogic journal, which was originally published in Tiflis (Tbilisi), then moved to Shusha in 1874, then to Yelisavetpol (Ganja) in 1875, then to Baku in 1877, and Erivan (Yerevan) in 1879.

In years of 1877–1920, there were more than 60 Armenian historical newspapers published in Baku. However, there are other Armenian newspapers and journals found in Baku which are not the historical types. They include: 
 Haykakan Ashkharh (The Armenian World), religious and pedagogic, Baku, 1877–1878, editor and publisher Stephannos Stephaney
 Aror (The Plough) illustrated calendar, Baku, 1893–1896, "Aror" Publishing House
 Sotsialist (The Socialist) official journal of the Social-Democratic Armenian Labor Party, Social Democratic Armenian Party Publishing House, 1904–1905
 Arshaluys (The Dawn), Baku, 1904
 Sotsial Democrat (The Social- Democrat), public affairs journal covering economics and politics, Baku, 1905, editors V. Marsyan and Lazo
 Banvori Tsayn (The Voice of the Labourer), 1906, editor S. Kasyan
 Bari Lur (The Good News) Christian newspaper, official newspaper of the Armenian evangelic community, Baku, Parayan and Mirzoyants Publishing House, 1906–1917, editor and publisher H.J. Tarayants
 Groh (The Attack), Baku, 1906–1907
 Trutsik (Leaflet) weekly, 1906–1907
 Giragnorya Tert (The Sunday Newspaper), Baku, 1906
 Koch Devet (The Appeal), Armenian-Azerbaijani newspaper, Baku, 1906, editors and publishers T. Harutyunyants and I.B. Ashurbekov
 Panvor (The Labourer), public-economic-political-literary newspaper, Baku, Erevantsyan Publishing House, 1907, editors and publishers H. Yuzbahsyan and G. Pijikyan
 Motsak (The Mosquito), satirical newspaper, Baku, 1907, editor H. Khojamir
 Orer (The Days), public-political- literary official newspaper of the Bolsheviks, Baku, 1907, Editors S.K. Shahumyan, Suren Spandaryan, S. Kasyan
 Aniv (The Wheel), literary-economic-political official newspaper of the Social Revolutionaries, Baku, N.A. Erevantsyan Publishing House, 1908, editor and publisher G. Aghajanyan
 Zang (The Bell), literary-public-economic newspaper, Baku, Khatisyan Publishing House, 1908–1909, editor and publisher K. Khatisyan
 Nor Orer (New Days), political-literary-public-economic newspaper, Baku, 1908–09, Erevantsyan Publishing House, 1908–1909, editor and publisher R. Ohanjanyan
 Shepor (The Trumpet), literary-public-economic-newspaper, Baku, N.A. Erevantsyan Publishing House, 1908, Baku, editor and publisher S. Shah-Paronyan
 Patanekan Gradaran (The Juvenile Library), journal, Baku, The Publishing House of the Armenian Cultural Community of Baku, 1908, editor K. Kharatyan
 Aravot (The Morning), literary-public-economic-political newspaper, Baku, N.A. Erevantsyan Publishing House, 1909, editor and publisher S. Harutyunyan
 Zndan (The Dungeon), literary-public-economic-political newspaper, Baku, N.A. Erevantsyan Publishing House, 1909, editor and publisher Nik. P. Izmayelyan
 Ughi (The Way) political-public-economic newspaper, Baku, Erevantsyan Publishing House, 1909, editor and publisher N.H. Qarhanyan
 Tadron ev Erajshtutyun (Theatre and Music), theatrical- musical-literary- artistic illustrated journal, Baku, 1910–17, S.T. Shahbazyan Publishing House, later Trud, editor and publisher A. Mayelyan
 Paros (The Light-house), literary-artistic illustrated weekly, Baku, Erevantsyan Publishing House, 1910, editor and publisher V. Tumanyan
 Koch (The Appeal), literary- public- economic weekly, Baku, Erevantsyan Publishing House, 1911, editor and publisher I.B. Miqayelyan
 Nor Khosq (The New Word), literary-public-political weekly, Baku, Erevantsyan Publishing House, 1911–1912, editor S.K. Shahumyan
 Nor Gyank (New Life), literary- public- political weekly, Baku, Erevantsyan Publishing House, 1911–1912, editor and publisher D. Ter-Danielyan
 Errand (The Ardour), literary-public-economic-political official weekly of the Socialist – Revolutionary Party, Baku, Erevantsyan Publishing House, 1912, editor and publisher V.S. Ghazaryants
 Giragi (The Sunday) Christian weekly, Baku, A. N. Taraeva and L.D Mirzoyants Publishing House, 1912
 Mer Ughin (Our Way), literary-political-economic collection, Baku, Erevantsyan Publishing House, 1912, editor D. Ananun
 Bagvi Tsayn (The Voice of Baku) newspaper, Baku, The Publishing House of the Mayor of Baku, publisher K. Khatisyan 
 Lusademin (At the Dawn), literary collection, Baku, Baku Paper Publishing House, 1913–1914, editor A. Alshushyan
 Arev (The Sun) literary- public- political official newspaper of the Social Democratic Party, Shahbazyan Publishing House, 1914–1919, editor Taghyanosyan
 Gordz (The Labour) literary-scientific- public-political journal, Baku, Vera Publishing House, 1917, editor K. Krasilnikyan
 Tsil (The Sprout), Baku, literary-artistic anthology, Baku, Erevantsyan Publishing House, 1914–1915, editor and publisher A. Barutchyan
 Mer Gyank (Our Life), Baku, 1914, editor St. Shahumyan
 Navak (The Boat), literary-public weekly, Baku, Aramazd Publishing House, 1914
 Shavigh (The Path), literary-public journal, Baku, Baku Publishing House, 1914
 Arek (The Sun) literary-public-political daily, Baku, Erevantsyan Publishing House, editor and publisher E. Abovyan
 Never vorberin (A Present for Orphans), Baku, 1915
 Ashxatanqi Droshov (With the Flag of Work), Baku, 1917
 Aroghj Gyank (The Healthy Life), Baku 1917, Erevantsyan Publishing House, editor Zaqaryan
 Banvor (The Labourer), Baku, 1917, Erevantsyan Publishing House, editor and publisher G. Pijikyan
 Nor Kyanq (The Life), Baku, 1917, Erevantsyan Publishing House, editor E. Ter-Ohanyan
 Haraj (The Forward) public-political daily, Baku, 1917
 Mer gordz (Our Work) Baku, 1917, Erevantsyan Publishing House, editor A. Stepanyan
 Mer Orer (Our days), social-democratic official newspaper, Baku, 1917
 Sotsial Democrat (The Social Democrat), Baku, 1917
 Veratcnund (The Renaissance), Baku, 1917
 Ashkhatavori Tsayn (The Voice of the Worker), Baku, 1918
 Banvor, Zinvor ev Navasti patgamavorneri khorhrdi teghekatu (The Herald of the Labourer, Soldier and Sailor Delegates’ Council), Baku, 1918
 Banvori khosq (The Word of Laborer), Baku, 1918
 Shepor (The Trumpet), Baku, 1918, editor and publisher E. Palyan
 Teghekatu (The Reference Book), Baku, 1918
 Yerkir (The Country), political-public- literary newspaper, Baku, 1919, editor I Amiryan
 Komunist (The Communist), official newspaper of the Communist Party of Azerbaijan and Baku Commune, Baku, 1920
 Teghekagir (The Official Gazette), journal of the Central Committee of the Communist Party of Azerbaijan, Baku, 1920–1921.

References 

Armenian diaspora
Armenians in Azerbaijan
Armenian-language newspapers